The Schöneiche bei Berlin tramway is the tramway network of the city of Schöneiche bei Berlin, Germany.

Route
The route starts at the Friedrichshagen S-Bahn station, located on line S3. It also connects to lines 60 and 61 of the Berlin trams here. It then runs alongside Schöneicher Landstraße, before diverging from the road, and entering Brandenburg, and the town of Schöneiche. It then runs on street, through Kirschenstraße and Puschkinstraße, before passing the depot, at which point it returns to a single track running alongside Dorfstraße. It then makes a 90 degree turn at a roundabout, and travels past the centre of Schöneiche. After leaving Schöneiche, and following Kalkberger Straße, passing under the A10 road, the line then enters the town of Rüdersdorf, terminating at a loop located at Marienstraße.

Ticketing
The line is route 88 in the VBB system, with the majority of the line being located in the Berlin C fare zone. VBB tickets can be purchased that allow travel on the tramway, along with other transport in the VBB scheme. For passengers only travelling on the tram, the line also sells single, 10 journey, and monthly tickets, only valid on the tram. For these tickets the line is divided into three zones: Berlin, Schöneiche, and Rüdersdorf.

Rolling stock
The tramway currently operates three types of vehicle in regular use.

The oldest vehicles in use are four Düwag GT6 trams, purchased from Heidelberg. These were originally built in 1966 and 1973, and do not provide low floor access. The other main part of the fleet are three Tatra KT4DNF trams, which were purchased from Cottbus and Szeged, and were built in 1987 and 1990. These do provide low floor access to the middle section of the tramcar.

Recently, the tramway has purchased two prototype Transtech Artic low floor articulated trams. Tram 51 entered service in September 2018. Tram 52 was delivered in early 2019. The first entirely low floor service was operated on May 1, 2019. A third Artic-Tram, numbered 53, entered service on March 25, 2020.

References

External links 

 SRS official website
 Track plan of the Berlin tram system, including the Schöneiche tramway

Tram transport in Germany
Transport in Brandenburg